Mary Noe is an American educator, writer and lecturer. She holds the rank of Professor, College of Professional Studies St. John's University,. She served as Associate Academic Dean, College of Professional Studies for academic year 2015-16. Noe is the recipient of the Outstanding Faculty Achievement Award (University 2016).

Biography
Noe is a graduate of Brooklyn College magna cum laude and received her Juris Doctor degree from St. John's University School of Law.   She has been admitted to practice law in New York since 1989.

Noe has written on the subject of legal liability arising out of both data breaches and social media postings. She authored Sticks and Stones Will Break My Bones but Whether Words Harm will Be Decided by a Judge published in the January 2016 issue of the New York State Bar Association Journal (Vol. 88, No. 1). Her article "Facebook: The New Employment Battleground" was the cover-story in the June 2014 issue of the New York State Bar Association Journal (Vol. 86, No.5). She also authored the cover-story "Data Breaches" in the Summer 2012 issue of the NY Litigator, a journal of the Commercial & Federal Litigation Section of the New York State Bar Association (Vol.17, No. 1).

Noe has created and edited an undergraduate journal at St. John's,The Legal Apprentice  as a showcase for quality student writing. Articles are principally on topics that intersect with the law.  The inaugural issue featured welcoming remarks from Chief Judge Loretta A. Preska, U.S. District Court, Southern District of New York.

For the last twelve years, Professor Noe has served as an Impartial Hearing Officer in cases brought by parents seeking tuition reimbursement or other funding for students with disabilities under a federal law known as Individuals with Disabilities Education Act or IDEA.  Noe, together with co-authors Mary McCaffrey, M.S, and Robert Meager, PsyD published IEP Workshop Building Teacher-Parent Partnerships (Attainment Co. 2011) which is believed to be the first work in this area accompanied by a DVD displaying a simulated meeting between parents and school officials. She frequently writes and lectures on the subject of special education law. IDEA requires public schools in the U.S. to develop an IEP or Individualized Education Program for each student with a statutorily defined disability.

Noe also has served as an administrative law judge for the New York State Office of Professional Medical Conduct, the body with jurisdiction over disciplinary cases against medical doctors in New York.

References 

Living people
Year of birth missing (living people)
American educators
Brooklyn College alumni